Sankrail is a census town in Sankrail CD Block of Howrah Sadar subdivision in Howrah district in the Indian state of West Bengal. It is a part of Kolkata Urban Agglomeration.

Geography
It has an average elevation of 2 metres (6 feet).

Demographics
As per 2011 Census of India Sankrail had a total population of 29,114 of which 14,919 (51%) were males and 14,195 (49%) were females. Population below 6 years was 3,328. The total number of literates in Sankrail was 21,192 (82.18% of the population over 6 years).

Sankrail was part of Kolkata Urban Agglomeration in 2011 census.

 India census, Sankrail had a population of 25,590. Males constitute 54% of the population and females 46%. Sankrail has an average literacy rate of 64%, higher than the national average of 59.5%: male literacy is 69% and female literacy is 59%. In Sankrail, 12% of the population is under 6 years of age.

Transport
Munsirhat-Sankrail Road (Sankrail Station Road) is the artery of the town.

Bus

Private Bus
 69 Sankrail railway station - Howrah Station
 77 Sankrail railway station - Amta

Mini Bus
 24 Sankrail railway station - Howrah Station

Bus Routes Without Numbers
 Sankrail railway station - New Town Shapoorji Housing Estate
 Sankrail railway station - Sealdah Station (Barafkal)

Train
Sankrail railway station on Howrah-Kharagpur line serves the locality.

Gallery

References

Cities and towns in Howrah district
Neighbourhoods in Kolkata
Kolkata Metropolitan Area